Danemead is a 5.6-hectare nature reserve west of Hoddesdon in Hertfordshire, managed by the Herts and Middlesex Wildlife Trust. It is part of the Wormley-Hoddesdonpark Wood North Site of Special Scientific Interest.

The site has hornbeam woodland, damp acid grassland, a stream, scrub and valley mire. There are many butterflies and wild flowers, including meadowsweet and devil's-bit scabious.

The entrance is on a section of Ermine Street, formerly a major Roman road and now a bridleway. Access is from the Ermine Street carpark on Cock Lane. There is a gate on Cock Lane to a private estate called Danemead Scout Campsite  which is closed to the public, and the nature reserve is behind the private estate.

Notes

References

Herts and Middlesex Wildlife Trust reserves